Bailey Barton Burritt (31 May 1878 – 18 June 1954) was a United States public health and social welfare advocate known as "the father of the family health movement." He was the chairman of the executive council of the Community Service Society.

Biography
He graduated from the University of Rochester in 1902 and Columbia University in 1903. He married Ruth Hogarth Dennis (1879–1960) on May 18, 1909.

References

1878 births
1954 deaths
University of Rochester alumni
Columbia University alumni
American public health doctors